Liljeholmen is a district of the Hägersten-Liljeholmen borough in Söderort, the southern suburban part of Stockholm.

History
In 1860 Liljeholmen became the first suburb outside Stockholm city limits. The district was then one of two self-governing villages within the Brännkyrka rural district (the other was Örby), until 1913, when it was incorporated into Stockholm. During the 1912 Summer Olympics, it hosted parts of the cycling and equestrian events.

Economy and transportation
Liljeholmen contains industries and offices in Årstadal, apartments in Nybohov and Nyboda and Lake Trekanten. New residential areas are being built around the central square, former industrial areas near Årstaviken, and at Marievik as a part of several projects to enlarge the inner core of Stockholm. Metro lines 13 and 14 stop at Liljeholmen Metro station and there are 3 tram stops for Tvärbanan in the district: Årstadal, Liljeholmen and Trekanten.

Sightseeing 
 The Fruit Park in Liljeholmen is a popular playground near Lake Trekanten where all of the equipment is shaped like fruit.
 The Nybohovs vattenreservoar water reservoir, located on a hill on the southwestern corner of Lake Trekanten provides a good view of the lake and surrounding area.

See also 
 Hornstull
 Geography of Stockholm
 Internationella kunskapsgymnasiet

References

External links 
Liljeholmstorget

Venues of the 1912 Summer Olympics
Olympic cycling venues
Olympic equestrian venues
Districts of Stockholm